Edward Allan Williford (December 22, 1892 – June 17, 1981) was an American basketball player and coach. He was the head coach for the Indiana Hoosiers men's basketball team for the 1915–1916 season, compiling a record of 6–7.

References

External links
Allan Willisford at College Basketball at Sports-Reference.com

1892 births
1981 deaths
Basketball coaches from Illinois
Basketball players from Illinois
Indiana Hoosiers men's basketball coaches
Indiana Hoosiers men's basketball players
People from Nokomis, Illinois
Place of birth missing